Sourdough is a mixture of flour and water inhabited by a symbiosis of Lactic acid bacteria and yeasts. It is used in baking to leaven and acidify bread.

Yeasts
Candida humilis (formerly C. milleri)
Candida krusei
Kazachstania exigua
Pichia saitoi
Saccharomyces cerevisiae
Torulopsis holmii

Lactic acid bacteria
Lactobacillus acetotolerans
Lactobacillus acidophilus
Lactobacillus alimentarius
Lactobacillus brevis
Lactobacillus buchneri
Lactobacillus casei
Lactobacillus crustorum
Lactobacillus delbrueckii
Lactobacillus farciminis
Lactobacillus fermenti
Lactobacillus fermentum
Lactobacillus fructivorans
Lactobacillus frumenti
Lactobacillus hilgardii
Lactobacillus leichmannii
Lactobacillus mindensis
Lactobacillus panis
Lactobacillus paralimentarius
Lactobacillus pastorianus
Lactobacillus plantarum
Lactobacillus pontis
Lactobacillus reuteri
Lactobacillus sanfranciscensis (formerly L. brevis var. lindneri)
Lactobacillus viridescens
Pediococcus acidilactici

See also
 List of sourdough breads

References

Bacteriology
Baking
Leavening agents
Sourdough breads
Microbiology
Microorganism